Krystyna Borowicz (25 January 1923, Kalisz – 30 May 2009, Warsaw) was a Polish actress.

From 1950 to 1960 she acted at the Polish Theatre in Warsaw, and from 1960 until her retirement in 1990 at the Ateneum Theatre. In the years 1957 to 1990, she starred in 16 plays on Television Theatre.

She died on 30 May 2009 in Warsaw. She was buried in Augsburg.

External links
http://www.imdb.com/name/nm0097267/bio

1923 births
2009 deaths
People from Kalisz
Polish film actresses
Polish stage actresses
Aleksander Zelwerowicz National Academy of Dramatic Art in Warsaw alumni
Recipients of the Order of Polonia Restituta